Fabien Alfranso Bownes (born February 29, 1972 in Aurora, Illinois) is a former professional American football wide receiver in the National Football League. He played six seasons for the Chicago Bears (1995, 1997–1998) and the Seattle Seahawks (1999–2001). He also ran track and graduated from Western Illinois University with a major in Communication.  He began graduate studies in Communication during his last semester at that university, when he participated in on-campus tryouts for National Football League teams.  He also has a brother that plays tennis for Western Illinois University. (Mandela Shepard)

References

1972 births
Living people
Sportspeople from Aurora, Illinois
Players of American football from Illinois
American football wide receivers
Western Illinois Leathernecks football players
Chicago Bears players
Seattle Seahawks players